Manigod is a commune in the Haute-Savoie department in the Auvergne-Rhône-Alpes region of Eastern France. In 2018, it had a population of 998.

Geography
The linked area of Manigod consists of several different ski areas: La Croix Fry, Merdassier, Manigod Village, among others. The village itself is small and traditional with very few shops, all selling local produce such as the locally made Reblochon. The Plateau de Beauregard is a famous local walk with a view of Mont Blanc. The River Fier has its source in the commune. Nearby villages include Thônes, La Clusaz, Saint-Jean-de-Sixt and Le Grand Bornand. Farther away are the larger cities of Annecy (prefecture) and Chamonix.

Gallery

See also
Communes of the Haute-Savoie department

References

Communes of Haute-Savoie